The Lehigh Valley Open was a golf tournament on the Nike Tour. It ran from 1998 to 1999. It was played at Center Valley Club in Center Valley, Pennsylvania.

In 1999 the winner earned $40,500.

Winners

Former Korn Ferry Tour events
Golf in Pennsylvania
Recurring sporting events established in 1998
Recurring sporting events disestablished in 1999